A horse-drawn vehicle is a mechanized piece of equipment pulled by one horse or by a team of horses. These vehicles typically had two or four wheels and were used to carry passengers and/or a load. They were once common worldwide, but they have mostly been replaced by automobiles and other forms of self-propelled transport.

General

Horses were domesticated circa 3500 BCE. Prior to that oxen were used. Historically a wide variety of arrangements of horses and vehicles have been used, from chariot racing, which involved a small vehicle and four horses abreast, to horsecars or trollies, which used two horses to pull a car that was used in cities before electric trams were developed. 

A two-wheeled horse-drawn vehicle is a cart (see various types below, both for carrying people and for goods). Four-wheeled vehicles have many names – one for heavy loads is most commonly called a wagon. Very light carts and wagons can also be pulled by donkeys (much smaller than horses), ponies or mules. Other smaller animals are occasionally used, such as large dogs, llamas and goats (see draught animals). Heavy wagons, carts and agricultural implements can also be pulled by other large draught animals such as oxen, water buffalo, yaks or even camels and elephants.

Vehicles pulled by one animal (or by animals in a single file) have two shafts which attach either side of the rearmost animal (the wheel animal or wheeler).  Two animals in single file are referred to as a tandem arrangement, and three as a randem. Vehicles which are pulled by a pair (or by a team of several pairs) have a pole which attaches between the wheel pair. Other arrangements are also possible, for example, three or more abreast (a troika), a wheel pair with a single lead animal (a "unicorn"), or a wheel pair with three lead animals abreast (a "pickaxe"). Very heavy loads sometimes had an additional team behind to slow the vehicle down steep hills. Sometimes at a steep hill with frequent traffic, such a team would be hired to passing wagons to help them up or down the hill. Horse-drawn carriages have been in use for at least 3,500 years.

Two-wheeled vehicles are balanced by the distribution of weight of the load (driver, passengers, and goods) over the axle, and then held level by the animal – this means that the shafts (or sometimes a pole for two animals) must be fixed rigidly to the vehicle's body. Four-wheeled vehicles remain level on their own, and so the shafts or pole are hinged vertically, allowing them to rise and fall with the movement of the animals. A four-wheeled vehicle is also steered by the shafts or pole, which are attached to the front axle; this swivels on a turntable or "fifth wheel" beneath the vehicle.

From the 15th century drivers of carts were known as carmen, and in London were represented by the Worshipful Company of Carmen. In 1890 there were 13,800 companies in the United States in the business of building carriages pulled by horses. By 1920, only 90 such companies remained.

Vehicles primarily for carrying people

Road
 Ambulance: much the same purpose as the modern sense. Details of the design varied but would be a lightly built and well-sprung, enclosed vehicle with provision for seated casualties and stretchers.
 Barouche: an elegant, high-slung, open carriage with a seat in the rear of the body and a raised bench at the front for the driver, a servant.
 Berlin: A four-wheeled covered carriage developed in the 17th century. 
 Brake: Describes several types of vehicles. A large, four-wheeled carriage frame, circa late 19th and early 20th century.
 Britzka: A long, spacious carriage of four wheels, pulled by two horses.
 Brougham: A specific, light four-wheeled carriage, circa mid 19th century.
 Buckboard: A very simple four-wheeled wagon, circa early 19th century.
 Buggy: a light, open, four-wheeled carriage, often driven by its owner.
 Cabriolet: a shortening of cabriolet. Joseph Hansom based the design of his public hire vehicle on the cabriolet so the name cab stuck to vehicles for public hire.
 Calash or Calèshe: see barouche: A four-wheeled, shallow vehicle with two double seats inside, arranged vis-à-vis, so that the sitters on the front seat faced those on the back seat.
 Cape cart: A two-wheeled four-seater carriage drawn by two horses and formerly used in South Africa. 
 Cariole: A light, small, two- or four-wheeled vehicle, open or covered, drawn by a single horse. 
 Carriage: in the late eighteenth century, roughly equivalent to the modern word "vehicle" [Walker]. It later came to be restricted to "passenger vehicle" and even to "private, enclosed passenger vehicle" [Britannica]. This last is the sense adopted by the linked article.
 Carryall: A type of carriage used in the United States in the 19th century. It is a light, four-wheeled vehicle, usually drawn by a single horse and with seats for four or more passengers.
 Chaise: A light two- or four-wheeled traveling or pleasure carriage, with a folding hood or calash top for one or two people.
 Charabanc: A larger wagon pulled by multiple horses.
 Cidomo: a form of horse-drawn carriage popular in the Lesser Sunda Islands of Indonesia.
 Clarence: A closed, four-wheeled horse-drawn vehicle with a projecting glass front and seats for four passengers inside.
 Coach: A large, usually closed, four-wheeled carriage with two or more horses harnessed as a team, controlled by a coachman.
 Coupé: The horse-drawn carriage equivalent of a modern coupe automobile.
 Covered wagon: the name given to canvas-topped farm wagons used by North American settlers to move both their families and household goods westward. Varieties of this wagon include the Conestoga wagon (larger wagons able to carry large amounts of goods and primarily used on flat trails, for example the Santa Fe Trail) and prairie schooner (smaller wagons more suited for mountainous regions, for example the Oregon and California Trails).
 Curricle: A smart, light two-wheeled chaise or "chariot", large enough for the driver and a passenger and usually drawn by a carefully matched pair of horses.
 Diligence: a French stagecoach. The 19th-century ones came in three sizes, La petite diligence, La grande diligence and L'impériale.
 Dog cart: a sprung cart used for transporting a gentleman, his loader, and his gun dogs.
 Dos-à-dos
 Drag (carriage)
 Droshky or Drozhki: A low, four-wheeled open carriage used especially in Russia.
 Equipage
 Ekka - a one horse cart of India, Pakistan and Bangladesh.
 Fiacre: A form of hackney coach, a horse-drawn four-wheeled carriage for hire.
 Fly: A horse-drawn public coach or delivery wagon, especially one let out for hire.
 Four-in-hand coach
 Gharry: A horse-drawn cab especially used in India.
 Gig (carriage): A light, two-wheeled sprung cart pulled by one horse. 
 Gladstone
 Governess cart: a sprung cart with two inward-facing benches, high sides and entry at the back. The upper part of the body was often of wicker.
 Growler: the four-wheeled version of a hansom cab
 Horsebus
 Hackney carriage: A carriage for hire, especially in London.
 Hansom cab: a one-horsed, two-wheeled, manoeuvrable public hire vehicle.
 Hearse: The horse-drawn version of a modern hearse.
 Herdic: A specific type of horse-drawn carriage, used as an omnibus.
 Jaunting car: a sprung cart in which passengers sat back to back with their feet outboard of the wheels.
 Karozzin: a traditional Maltese carriage drawn by one horse or a pair
 Kid hack: a van used in the US for carrying children to and from school.
 Landau: A low-shelled, luxury, convertible carriage.
 Limousine
 Meadowbrook (carriage)
 Omnibus
 One-horse shay: a light, covered, two-wheeled carriage for two persons, drawn by a single horse.
 Outside car: see jaunting car: A light two-wheeled carriage for a single horse, possibly with passenger seats facing sideways over the wheels
 Phaeton: a light-weight horse-drawn open carriage (usually with two seats); or an early-nineteenth-century sports car

 Post chaise: A fast carriage for traveling post in the 18th and early 19th centuries.
 Ralli car: a light two wheeled sprung cart (gig) with two forward-facing and two rear-facing seats back-to-back, and a sliding fore-and-aft seat adjustment to allow the vehicle to balance with different numbers of passengers.
 Ratha: The Indo-Iranian term for a spoked-wheel chariot or a cart of antiquity.
 Rig
 Rockaway: A term applied to two types of carriage: a light, low, United States four-wheel carriage with a fixed top and open sides that may be covered by waterproof curtains, and a heavy carriage enclosed at sides and rear, with a door on each side. 
 Sleigh: a vehicle with runners for use in snow
 Spider phaeton: Of American origin and made for gentlemen drivers, a high and lightly constructed carriage with a covered seat in front and a footman's seat behind
 Sprung cart: a light, two-wheeled vehicle with springing, for informal passenger use. Its name varied according to the body mounted on it. See dog cart, gig, governess cart, jaunting car, and trap.
 Stagecoach: a public coach travelling in timetabled stages between stables which supply fresh horses.

 Stanhope (carriage): a light, open, one-seated carriage: originally with two wheels, later also with four.
 State Coach: a very grand coach used for royal state occasions. For example, Gold State Coach, Irish State Coach, Lord Mayor of London's State Coach, Scottish State Coach and the Speaker's State Coach.
 Sulky: a very light two-wheeled cart for one person, especially used for harness racing.
 Surrey: A popular American doorless, four-wheeled carriage of the late 19th and early 20th centuries, usually two seated for four passengers.
 Tanga: a light horse-drawn carriage used for transportation in India, Pakistan, and Bangladesh.
 Tarantass or Tarantas: A Russian four-wheeled horse-drawn vehicle on a long longitudinal frame.
 Tilbury: A light, open, two-wheeled carriage, with or without a top
 Training cart or training trap: a simple sprung or unsprung two-person modern cart for training a harness horse on smooth roads. Often made of steel with motorcycle wheels, and sometimes with adjustable shafts for different-sized horses.
 Trap: an open sprung cart. Often used in a general sense to cover any small passenger-carrying cart.
 Troika: a sleigh drawn by three horses harnessed abreast. Occasionally, a similar wheeled vehicle.
 Vardo (gypsy wagon): a vardo is a traditional horse-drawn wagon used by English Romani Gypsies.
 Victoria: a one-horse carriage with a front-facing bench seat. The body was slung low, in front of the back axle. Driven by a servant.
 Village cart
 Vis-à-vis: Refers to the seating arrangement, with a rear seat facing forward and the forward seat facing to the rear.
 Voiturette
 Wagonette: a four-wheeled vehicle for carrying people, usually with a forward-facing seat at the front and two rows of inward-facing seats behind.
 Whim
 Whitechapel: a two-wheeled horse-drawn cart similar to a dog cart. Lightweight and versatile.

Railway
 Horsecar (also streetcar, US name, or tram, outside the US)

Waterway
 Fly boat: A canal boat which changed horses at stages and could therefore keep moving, care being taken to maximize its speed.
 Horse-drawn boat

Vehicles primarily for carrying goods

Road

 Bow wagon: A simple agricultural wagon with laths bowed over the wheels in the manner of mudguards, to keep bulky loads such as straw from contact with them. An Australian design.
 Un-sprung cart: A simple two-wheeled vehicle for workaday use in carrying bulk loads. It was usually drawn by one horse.
 Chuckwagon
 Chasse-maree: A four-horse adaptation of the cart principle for the rapid delivery of fish to French markets.
 Conestoga wagon: A large, curved-bottom wagon for carrying commercial or government freight. See covered wagon.
 Cart: Particularly in Australia and New Zealand, an un-sprung cart. In Britain, even in the 18th century, the name came to be associated with brewers' deliveries so that the later vehicle that was more correctly called a trolley also came to be known as a brewer's dray. These are still seen at horse shows in Britain.
Also a sledge used for moving felled trees in the same way as the wheeled skidder. (See implements, below). It could be used in woodland, apparently with or without snow, but was useful on frozen lakes and waterways. [OED]
 Float: A light, two-wheeled domestic delivery vehicle with the centre of its axle cranked downward to allow low-loading and easy access to the goods. It was used particularly for milk delivery.
 Lorry: A low-loading platform body with four small wheels mounted underneath it. The driver's seat was mounted on the headboard.

 Mail coach: A stagecoach primarily for the carriage of mail, though also carrying passengers.
 Mophrey: An un-sprung cart which could be extended forwards with the addition of front wheels. It was used by small farmers as and when dense or bulky loads were to be carried (muck-spreading and harvest). An eastern English design.
 Pantechnicon van: Originally, a van used by The Pantechnicon for delivering goods to its customers.
 Prairie schooner: The name given years later to the canvas-topped farm wagons used by North American settlers to move their families and capital goods westward. See covered wagon and Conestoga wagon.
 Telega
 Travois: A very simple sledge used for moving relatively small loads, consisting of a pair of shafts dragging on the ground.
 Trolley: Like a lorry, but with slightly larger wheels and slightly higher deck. The driver's seat was mounted on the headboard.
 Trolley and lift van: A standardized trolley and a lift van, a standardized box, designed to fit each other or any other of the same sort. The lift van was the direct counterpart of the modern container in the materials and size appropriate to its time.
 Wagon: See also twenty mule team
 Wain

Railway
 Wagonways - horse drawn trains.
 Rubbish wagon or slab wagon or slate wagon: A small, four-wheeled truck used for carrying blocks of slate out of a quarry.
 Dandy waggon: A special rail car on a gravity train used to transport the horse while coasting down a hill.

Waterway
 Broad boat: Used on the broad (14 ft) canals of Britain and towed from the tow path.
 Flatboat: A canal boat of simple box-shaped design used on nineteenth-century American waterways.
 Horse-drawn boat: A general term relating to broad or narrow canal boats for passenger or freight carriage.
 Narrowboat: Used on the narrow (7 ft) canals of Britain and towed from the tow path.
 Slow boat: A canal boat which used only one team of horses which must stop each night to rest.

Agricultural and other implements

 Calliope or Fairground organ
 Koneke  noun, New Zealand - a farm vehicle with runners in front and wheels at the rear [Maori].
 Plough
 Potato spinner
 Reaper
 Reaper-binder
 Seed drill
 Skidder
 Thresher

War vehicles

 Caisson/Limber
 Chariot
 Gun carriage
 Horse artillery
 Scythed chariot
 Tachanka
 War wagon

See also

 Cart
 Combined driving
 Draft horse
 Driving (horse)
 Guard stone
 Horse harness
 Naturmobil
 Types of carriages
 Wagon

Notes

References

Citations

Sources 

 Encyclopædia Britannica (1960)
 Ingram, A. Horse-Drawn Vehicles Since 1760 (1977) 
 Oxford English Dictionary (1971 & 1987) 
 Walker, J. A Critical Pronouncing Dictionary and Expositor of the English Language (1791)

External links

The oldest surviving horse drawn tramway operating in Douglas on the Isle of Man
 Articles about Horse-drawn Carriages
  National Carriage Collection - Cobb and Co Museum

Animal-powered vehicles
Horse driving
Wagons